Artemisia olchonensis is a species of flowering plant in the wormwood genus Artemisia, family Asteraceae, native to Irkutsk Oblast in Russia. It is found only on Olkhon Island of Lake Baikal.

References

olchonensis
Endemic flora of Russia
Flora of Irkutsk Oblast
Plants described in 1970